is a 1965 Japanese jidaigeki and drama film directed by Kaneto Shindō. It is based on the play Kaoyo by Jun'ichirō Tanizaki.

Plot
In the 14th century, Kō no Moronao, a deputy of the Ashikaga shogunate, hears of the beauty of Kaoyo, the wife of samurai Takasada of the Shioji clan. Obsessed with the thought of sleeping with Kaoyo, he instructs his chief chambermaid Jiju to arrange for a tête-à-tête. Jiju has letters in Moronao's name sent to Kaoyo, which first remain unanswered. Afraid to lose her position, Jiju sneaks into Takasada's house and tries to talk Kaoyo into giving in to the deputy's courting. Jiju is caught, confronted with Takasada's and Kaoyo's unconditional love and loyalty for each other. Moronao, furious about the woman's repeated resistance, orders Takasada to join the battles between the Northern and Southern dynasties to have him out of the way. The disobedient Takasada and his followers desert to meet with his wife at a secret place, where he is surrounded by Moronao's men. Takasada and his followers die in the subsequent battle, and Kaoyo has herself killed by family member Munemura. The victorious warriors and Jiju return to Moronao's estate, presenting him Kaoyo's severed head. Moronao is furious because he wanted her alive, not dead. Jiju starts laughing, and the severed head smiles.

Cast
 Nobuko Otowa as Jiju
 Kyōko Kishida as Kaoyo
 Eitaro Ozawa as Kō no Moronao
 Isao Kimura as Enya Takasada
 Kentaro Kaji as Rokuro
 Taiji Tonoyama as Munemura
 Jūkichi Uno as Yoshida Kenko, the poet

Notes

References

External links

1965 films
Japanese drama films
Jidaigeki films
Samurai films
Japanese films based on plays
Films set in feudal Japan
Films based on works by Jun'ichirō Tanizaki
Films directed by Kaneto Shindo
1960s Japanese films